SAGE-718 is experimental drug being investigated for the treatment of neurological disorders and cognitive impairment.  It acts as a positive allosteric modulator of the NMDA receptor, whose activity is essential for learning, memory, and cognition.  SAGE-718 is an analog of the neurosteroid 24S-hydroxycholesterol.

As of 2022, SAGE-718 is in Phase II clinical trials for Alzheimer's disease, Parkinson's disease, and Huntington's disease.

References 

Neurosteroids